Maricola is a suborder of triclad flatworms including species that mainly inhabit salt water environments. However, some species are also known from freshwater or brackish waters.

Taxonomy and phylogeny

History
The Maricola group was first proposed by Hallez in 1892. He recognized three families: Otoplanida, Procerodida and Bdellourida. Two years later, in 1884, Hallez renamed these families as Otoplanidae, Procerodidae and Bdellouridae. In 1906 Böhmig classified the Maricola in two families and five subfamilies: Procerodidae (Euprocerodinae, Cercyrinae, Micropharynginae) and Bdellouridae (Uteriporinae, Eubdellourinae). In 1909 Wilhelmi wrote a monograph on the group in which five families were described: Procerodidae, Uteriporidae, Cercyridae, Bdellouridae, Micropharyngidae. Von Graff used the same classification in 1916. In 1989 Sluys recognized the six present families on the basis of phylogenetic analyses of the whole group.

Classification
Taxonomical classification after Sluys et al. 2009:

Order Tricladida
Suborder Maricola
Superfamily Cercyroidea
Family Centrovarioplanidae
Family Cercyridae
Family Meixnerididae
Superfamily Bdellouroidea
Family Uteriporidae
Family Bdellouridae
Superfamily Procerodoidea
Family Procerodidae
Superfamily incerta sedis 
Genus Micropharynx
Genus Tiddles

Phylogeny
Phylogenetic supertree after Sluys et al., 2009:

References

 
Protostome suborders